The Brûlée River (English: Burnt River') is a tributary of the northwest shore of the Champlain River, flowing entirely in the municipality of Saint-Maurice, in the Les Chenaux Regional County Municipality, in the administrative region of Mauricie, in the province of Quebec, in Canada.

The course of the Brûlée river flows on the east side of the Saint-Maurice River and on the north side of the St. Lawrence River. This river is part of the hydrographic side of the Champlain River which generally winds north-east, then south-east, to the north shore of the St. Lawrence River.

With the exception of a short forest area at the start and end of its course, the Brûlée River descends mainly in agricultural areas. The river surface is generally frozen from mid-December until the end of March.

Geography 
The Brûlée river rises at the mouth of Lac Massicotte. This small body of water is located south of Plé de Saint-Narcisse, on the north side of the hamlet Lac-Montreuil. The small lake is located  North-east of the center of the village of Notre-Dame-du-Mont-Carmel,  to the North -West of the confluence of the Brule river and  North-West of the North shore of the St. Lawrence River.

  southwards, up to the route du rang Saint-Félix;
  south-east, up to the bridge on the road to Rang Sainte-Marguerite;
  towards the South-East, collecting the water from a stream (coming from the North-West) which drains an agricultural area from the hamlet Lac-Doucet de Notre-Dame-du-Mont-Carmel, and meandering up to route 352 (route du rang Saint-Jean);
  towards the South-East, by collecting the waters of the outlet (coming from the North-West) of Lac Lacommande and by snaking up to the bridge of the road to rang Saint-Alexis;
  towards the South-East, meandering to the confluence of the river.

The Brûlée River flows on the northwest bank of the Champlain River in the municipality of Saint-Maurice, on the west side of rue Notre-Dame.

The confluence of the Brûlée river is located at:
  Southeast of the village center of Saint-Maurice;
  North of the confluence of the Champlain River;
  north of the north shore of the St. Lawrence River.

Toponymy 
The toponym "Rivière Brûlée" was formalized on February 28, 1980, at the Commission de toponymie du Québec.

See also 

 Les Chenaux Regional County Municipality
 Saint-Maurice, a municipality
 Champlain River, a stream
 St. Lawrence River, a stream
 List of rivers of Quebec

References 

Les Chenaux Regional County Municipality
Rivers of Mauricie